Nazar the Brave ( Kaj Nazar) is a 1940 Soviet comedy film directed by Amasi Martirosyan. The title is a reference to the famous fairy tale of the same name by Hovhannes Tumanyan.

Plot 
A comical tale about how the coward Nazar who, as a joke of fate, appears to preside over the throne..

Cast 
Hambartsum Khachanyan - Nazar
Arus Asryan - Ustian
Avet Avetisyan - Sako
Manvel Manvelyan - Butler
L. Msrlyan - Tamada
Aram Amirbekyan - Voskan
Samvel Mkrtchyan - Teacher
A. Aslanyan - Priest
Artemy Harutyunyan - Courtier
Davit Gulazyan - Courtier
Khachatur Abrahamyan - Courtier
A. Ter-Abrahamyan - Ishkhan

References

External links
 
 

1940 films
1940 comedy films
Films directed by Amasi Martirosyan
Armenian black-and-white films
Soviet black-and-white films
Films set in Armenia
Soviet comedy films
Armenian comedy films
Soviet-era Armenian films
Armenfilm films